The Wuqi Fishing Port is a fishing port and fish market in Qingshui District, Taichung, Taiwan. The port is part of the Port of Taichung.

History
The fishing port was opened in 1989.

Features
The port features the fish trading area, food center, recreational park by the sea, a sculpture park, parking lots and yacht wharf.

Transportation
The port is accessible west from Qingshui Station of Taiwan Railways.

See also
 Port of Taichung

References

1989 establishments in Taiwan
Ports and harbors of Taichung
Transport infrastructure completed in 1989